Pau Donés Cirera (11 October 19669 June 2020) was a Spanish songwriter, guitarist, and vocalist of the Barcelona-based band Jarabe de Palo (also named "Jarabedepalo").

Biography
Donés grew up in Barcelona. He got his first guitar when he was 12 years old. Alongside his brother Marc, Pau Donés set up his first band: J. & Co. Band, and later on: Dentaduras Postizas. Donés split his schedule between performing concerts locally, working as an advertising agent, and studying economics.

In 1996, Donés formed Jarabe de Palo. Their debut album, La Flaca, became a commercial success in Spain after being featured in a TV advertisement. In 2008, he founded his own record company, Tronco Records.

In 2017, he published the book and double disc 50 palos coinciding with his 50th birthday. The album's release was accompanied by a tour of Spain and the United States. In 2018, he released a live album with the Costa Rican Philharmonic Orchestra, entitled Jarabe Filarmónico. In May 2020, his band released a new album titled Tragas o escupes. It was initially set for release in September 2020.

Personal life and health
Donés had a daughter named Sara, but was absent for much of her childhood because of his touring commitments.

On 1 September 2015, Donés cancelled all upcoming concerts following an operation for his colorectal cancer.

On 5 April 2016, Donés announced on Twitter that he had recovered from his illness. However, he had a relapse a year later. He died from cancer on 9 June 2020, aged 53.

Discography
 1996 - La flaca
 1998 - Depende
 2001 - De vuelta y vuelta
 2003 - Bonito
 2004 - 1 m²
 2007 - Adelantando
 2009 - Orquesta reciclando
 2011 - ¿Y ahora qué hacemos?
 2012 - Como un Pintor
 2014 - Somos
 2015 - Tour Americano 14-15 (CD/DVD)
 2018 - Jarabe Filarmónico
 2020 - Tragas o Escupes

Compilations
 2003 - ¿Grandes éxitos?
 2004 - Colección "Grandes"
 2005 - Completo, incompleto
 2006 - Edición 10º aniversario "La Flaca"

References

External links

 Jarabe de Palo's official website
 

1966 births
2020 deaths
20th-century Spanish male singers
20th-century Spanish singers
Musicians from Barcelona
Deaths from cancer in Spain
Deaths from colorectal cancer
21st-century Spanish male singers
21st-century Spanish singers